The glottal stop or glottal plosive is a type of consonantal sound used in many spoken languages, produced by obstructing airflow in the vocal tract or, more precisely, the glottis.

As a result of the obstruction of the airflow in the glottis, the glottal vibration either stops or becomes irregular with a low rate and sudden drop in intensity.

Features
Features of the glottal stop:

 It has no phonation, as there is no airflow through the glottis. It is voiceless, however, in the sense that it is produced without vibration of the vocal cords.

Writing

In the traditional Romanization of many languages, such as Arabic, the glottal stop is transcribed with the apostrophe  or the symbol ʾ, which is the source of the IPA character . In many Polynesian languages that use the Latin alphabet, however, the glottal stop is written with a rotated apostrophe,  (called ‘okina in Hawaiian and Samoan), which is commonly used to transcribe the Arabic ayin as well (also ) and is the source of the IPA character for the voiced pharyngeal fricative .

Other scripts also have letters used for representing the glottal stop, such as the Hebrew letter aleph  and the Cyrillic letter palochka , used in several Caucasian languages. The arabic script uses hamza , which can appear both as a diacritic and as an independent letter (though not part of the alphabet). Modern Latin alphabets for various Indigenous Languages of the Caucasus use the letter heng ('Ꜧ ꜧ'). In Tundra Nenets, it is represented by the letters apostrophe  and double apostrophe . In Japanese, glottal stops occur at the end of interjections of surprise or anger and are represented by the character .

In the graphic representation of most Philippine languages, the glottal stop has no consistent symbolization. In most cases, however, a word that begins with a vowel-letter (e.g. Tagalog , "dog") is always pronounced with an unrepresented glottal stop before that vowel (as in Modern German and Hausa). Some orthographies use a hyphen instead of the reverse apostrophe if the glottal stop occurs in the middle of the word (e.g. Tagalog , "love"; or Visayan gabi-i, "night"). If it occurs in the end of a word, the last vowel is written with a circumflex accent (known as the pakupyâ) if both a stress and a glottal stop occur in the final vowel (e.g. basâ, "wet") or a grave accent (known as the paiwà) if the glottal stop occurs at the final vowel, but the stress occurs at the penultimate syllable (e.g. batà, "child").

Some Canadian indigenous languages, especially some of the Salishan languages, have adopted the phonetic symbol ʔ itself as part of their orthographies. In some of them, it occurs as a pair of uppercase and lowercase characters, Ɂ and ɂ. The numeral 7 or question mark is sometimes substituted for ʔ and is preferred in some languages such as Squamish. SENĆOŦENwhose alphabet is mostly unique from other Salish languagescontrastly uses the comma  to represent the glottal stop, though it is optional.

In 2015, two women in the Northwest Territories challenged the territorial government over its refusal to permit them to use the ʔ character in their daughters' names: Sahaiʔa, a Chipewyan name, and Sakaeʔah, a Slavey name (the two names are actually cognates). The territory argued that territorial and federal identity documents were unable to accommodate the character. The women registered the names with hyphens instead of the ʔ, while continuing to challenge the policy.

In the Crow language, the glottal stop is written as a question mark: ?. The only instance of the glottal stop in Crow is as a question marker morpheme, at the end of a sentence.

Use of the glottal stop is a distinct characteristic of the Southern Mainland Argyll dialects of Scottish Gaelic. In such a dialect, the standard Gaelic phrase  ("I speak Gaelic"), would be rendered .

In English

Replacement of /t/
In English, the glottal stop occurs as an open juncture (for example, between the vowel sounds in uh-oh!,) and allophonically in t-glottalization.  In British English, the glottal stop is most familiar in the Cockney pronunciation of "butter" as "bu'er". Geordie English often uses glottal stops for t, k, and p, and has a unique form of glottalization. Additionally, there is the glottal stop as a null onset for English; in other words, it is the non-phonemic glottal stop occurring before isolated or initial vowels.

Often a glottal stop happens at the beginning of vowel phonation after a silence.

Speakers of Cockney, Scottish English and several other British dialects also pronounce an intervocalic  between vowels as in city. In Received Pronunciation, a glottal stop is inserted before a tautosyllabic voiceless stop: stop, that, knock, watch, also leap, soak, help, pinch.

In American English, a "t" is usually not aspirated in syllables ending either in a vowel + "t", such as "cat" or "outside"; or in a "t" + unstressed vowel + "n", such as "mountain" or "Manhattan". This is referred to as a "held t" as the airflow is stopped by tongue at the ridge behind the teeth. However, there is a trend of younger speakers in the Mid-Atlantic states to replace the "held t" with a glottal stop, so that "Manhattan" sounds like "Man-haʔ-in" or "Clinton" like "Cli(n)ʔ-in", where "ʔ" is the glottal stop. This may have crossed over from African American Vernacular English, particularly that of New York City.

Before initial vowels
Most English speakers today often use a glottal stop before the initial vowel of words beginning with a vowel, particularly at the beginning of sentences or phrases or when a word is emphasized. This is also known as "hard attack". Traditionally in Received Pronunciation, "hard attack" was seen as a way to emphasize a word. Today, in British, American and other varieties of English, it is increasingly used not only to emphasize but also simply to separate two words, especially when the first word ends in a glottal stop.

Occurrence in other languages
In many languages that do not allow a sequence of vowels, such as Persian, the glottal stop may be used epenthetically to prevent such a hiatus. There are intricate interactions between falling tone and the glottal stop in the histories of such languages as Danish (see stød), Cantonese and Thai.

In many languages, the unstressed intervocalic allophone of the glottal stop is a creaky-voiced glottal approximant. It is known to be contrastive in only one language, Gimi, in which it is the voiced equivalent of the stop. 

The table below demonstrates how widely the sound of glottal stop is found among the world's spoken languages:

See also
 Saltillo
 Index of phonetics articles
 Voiced pharyngeal fricative

References

Bibliography

External links

 

Glottal consonants
Plosives
Pulmonic consonants
Oral consonants